Lussier or Loussier is a surname of French origin.

Lussier or Loussier may refer to:

People
André Lussier (1933-2009), Canadian  physician, rheumatologist, and Professor Emeritus.
Jean Lussier (1891-1971), Canadian-American stunt performer and Niagara Falls daredevil.
Marcel Lussier (born 1944), Canadian politician.
Patrick Lussier (born 1964), Canadian-American filmmaker and editor.
René Lussier (born 1957), Canadian musician.
Robert Lussier (1924–1994), Canadian politician.
Yves A. Lussier, Canadian physician-scientist and co-founder of Purkinje Incorporated.
Jacques Loussier (1934–2019), French pianist and composer.

Fictional Characters 
 Stella Loussier, a fictional character in the anime Gundam SEED DESTINY

History 

The Canadian family "Lussier" can be traced to Pierre L'Huissier (1600-1688), the Bailiff of Paris. When Pierre L'Huissier's grandson, Jacques (1646-1713), arrived in New France, the name was recorded as "Lussier." According to the Family Education site the name is: "French [meaning]: A bearer of the name from Paris was in Quebec City by 1669." 

L'Huissier is a title of nobility given to the king's usher. The usher's responsibilities include acting as the court bailiff, collecting fines and taxes; and overseeing the finances of the manors of the kingdom. The name was a title of nobility. The occupation can also be an official in the courts and prisons or a doorkeeper of the legislative chamber. 

According to the website "House of Names," the name could be of Italian origin as it states: "The surname Lussier was first found in Bolgna (Latin: Bononia)...The Liuzza of Luzzi or Luzzo were first recorded as nobility in the year 972 and may have originally been from Cremona."

There are numerous spellings of the name, including L'Huissier, Lussier, Lucier, Lucia, Lucye, Lussye, Luce, and several other variations.

Other uses

According to Ancestry.com, "the name is an occupational name from Old French uissier 'usher', 'doorkeeper', with the definite article l(e). occupational name from Old French huchier 'carpenter', 'joiner', 'cabinetmaker'."

Lussier Hot Springs, a hot spring in Whiteswan Lake Provincial Park, British Columbia, Canada
Lussier River, a tributary of the Kootenay River, British Columbia, Canada

See also
 Lucier, a surname

French-language surnames